Siyaku (also, Siyakh and Siaku) is a village and municipality in the Astara Rayon of Azerbaijan.  It has a population of 1,281.  The municipality consists of the villages of Siyaku, Giləşə, and Binabəy.

References 

Populated places in Astara District